"Hoy quiero" is a Coca-Cola multi-genre song, recorded by various artists, including Teen Angels in Argentina and Kudai in Chile. There are also a rock version by band Ádammo and a cumbia version by Grupo 5.

Song information
The song was produced by Koko Stambuk, and released as Promo Airplay exclusive single in Argentina and Chile, this song contain three versions recorded by various artists. The song was released as promo also in the TV commercials for Coca-Cola.

Contest
MTV Argentina and Coca-Cola launched a contest exclusively for "Hoy quiero", that is still available. Every participant tape a video and send it to Coca-Cola's official web page. The users vote for their favorite's video. The winner receive a trip to a MTV show.

Track listing
Argentina Promo Single
 "Hoy quiero" (Teen Angels Latin Version) – 2:51
 "Hoy quiero" (Teen Angels Rock Version) – 2:41
 "Hoy quiero" (Teen Angels Pop Version) – 2:51

Chile Promo Single
 "Hoy quiero" (Kudai Pop Version) – 2:51
 "Hoy quiero" (Kudai Rock Version) – 2:41

References

2009 singles
Kudai songs
2008 songs
EMI Records singles